A young artist (Ditlev Blunck) considers a sketch in a mirror is a painting by Wilhelm Bendz from 1826; it is one of the series of Danish Golden Age portraits of artists.

Work's title 
The painting shows young Ditlev Blunck taking a break to examine a sketch for a portrait of George Valtin Sonne painting his brother, engraver Carl Edvard Sonne, by holding it up in front of a mirror to see if the composition works.

Genesis 
The painting was executed in 1826 at time when Wilhelm Bendz was preoccupied by artists' new role; no longer craftsmen but instead considered intellectuals, artists in the modern sense of the word. During the 1820s he painted a series of portraits of artists at work. Here the model is Bendz's fellow student, Ditlev Blunck, in the process of painting a portrait of the painter Jørgen Sonne.

Reason  
The painting shows a time when painters took themselves seriously as working artists. The image of Blunck standing in a packed room surrounded by his tools, paintbox, palette and easel, skull and sketchpad, signals that his work is serious, and requires thorough study before execution.

Notes

Sources 
 Klaus P. Mortensen, Spejlinger - litteratur og refleksion, 2000,

External links 
 Wilhelm Bendz: En ung kunstner (Ditlev Blunck) betragter en skitse i et spejl - Statens Museum for Kunst
 Skabelse og spejl - Kultur | www.b.dk
 Guldalderforskningens paradigmer – eksemplificeret på et maleri af Wilhelm Bendz - Arkivet, Thorvaldsens Museum

1826 paintings
Paintings by Wilhelm Bendz
Paintings in the collection of the National Gallery of Denmark
19th-century paintings in Denmark
Paintings about painting